Dictyophleba is a genus of flowering plants in the family Apocynaceae first described as a genus in 1898. It is native to Africa and to the Comoros Islands in the Indian Ocean.

Species
 Dictyophleba leonensis (Stapf) Pichon - West Africa from Cameroon to Liberia
 Dictyophleba lucida (K.Schum.) Pierre - Comoros, central + southern Africa from Nigeria east to Tanzania and south to Zimbabwe
 Dictyophleba ochracea (K.Schum. ex Hallier f.) Pichon - central Africa from Nigeria to Zaire
 Dictyophleba rudens Hepper - Cameroon
 Dictyophleba setosa B.de Hoogh - Cameroon, Gabon
 Dictyophleba stipulosa (S.Moore ex Wernham) Pichon - from Ivory Coast to Congo-Brazzaville

References

Apocynaceae genera
Rauvolfioideae